L16 or L-16 may refer to:

Vehicles 
Aircraft
 Aeronca L-16, a United States Army liaison aircraft
 Albatros L.16, a German biplane
 Hansa-Brandenburg L.16, a Austro-Hungarian triplane
 L16, a United States Navy L-class blimp

Ships
 , a frigate of the Royal Danish Navy
 , submarine of the Royal Navy
 , a destroyer of the Royal Navy
 , an amphibious assault ship of the Indian Navy
 , a Leninets-class submarine

Other uses 
 L16 81mm mortar, a British standard mortar
 Lectionary 16, a 12th-century Greek manuscript of the New Testament
 Meadowlark Airport, in Huntington Beach, California
 Nissan L16 engine, an automobile engines
 L16, an RTP payload format